David R. Wright (December 24, 1935 – November 18, 2016) was a Democratic member of the Pennsylvania House of Representatives.

References

Democratic Party members of the Pennsylvania House of Representatives
2016 deaths
1935 births